Walter Leonard Murphy (December 11, 1937–) is an American jurist who served as a justice on the New Hampshire Superior Court from 1983 to 2003 and was the first football coach at Plymouth State University. In 1985 Murphy ruled in a case between Dartmouth College and their head football coach, Joe Yukica, that resulted in Yukica regaining his job.

Early life 
Murphy was born on December 11, 1937 to James Walter and Mary P. (Leonard) Murphy. He graduated from the College of the Holy Cross in 1959 and Boston College Law School in 1962. He was a member of the varsity track team at Holy Cross. On July 14, 1962 he married Joan Elizabeth Hjelm. They had five children.

Coaching
Murphy was the varsity football coach at Plymouth High School in Plymouth, New Hampshire from 1964 to 1969. In 1970 he became the first football coach at Plymouth State University. On the first play in school history, Alan Wool returned the opening kickoff 95 yards for a touchdown on a double-reverse kickoff return play that Murphy had the team practice the night before its first game. The Panthers finished the inaugural season with an 0-3 record, including a loss to Acadia University in a game played under a combination of Canadian and American football rules. The following year, Plymouth State finished 5-3, giving the school its first winning season.

Legal career
Murphy was admitted to the New Hampshire bar in 1962 and began his legal career as an associate of William F. Batchelder. In 1963 he became a partner of the firm, which was known as Batchelder & Murphy until Batchelder's appointment to the New Hampshire Superior Court in 1970. He then practiced with Ross V. Deachman from 1970 to 1975. From 1975 to 1977, Murphy was the clerk of the Grafton County Superior Court. He was then a partner of Murphy & Foley with Robert J. Foley until his appointment to the bench in 1983.

Murphy also served as a member of the Plymouth school committee from 1968 to 1978 and was the town moderator from 1978 to 1983.

Judicial career
In December 1983, Murphy was appointed an associate justice on the New Hampshire Superior Court. He served as supervisory judge of the Hillsborough Superior Court and was a member of the superior court executive committee. He was also an adjunct professor at the Franklin Pierce School of Law and a faculty advisor to the National Judicial College. In October 2000 he was appointed chief justice of the New Hampshire Superior Court by Governor Jeanne Shaheen. He retired from the bench in 2003.

Yukica v. Leland
Dartmouth head football coach Joe Yukica was asked by athletic director Ted Leland to resign after a 2–7–1 1985 season. He refused and on November 29, 1985, Yukica was removed as head coach and reassigned to another position in the athletic department for the remainder of his contract, which was to expire on June 30, 1987. Yukica, represented by attorney Michael Slive, filed suit seeking to have his dismissal declared illegal and be allowed to complete his contract. Dartmouth, represented by Thomas D. Rath, contended that the school had the right to change the terms of Yukica's contract as long it fulfilled the financial terms. During the trial, fellow coaches Joe Paterno, Jack Bicknell, and Bob Blackman testified on Yukica's behalf. On December 13, 1985, Murphy ruled in favor of Yukica. Dartmouth had the right to appeal, but the two sides reached an out-of-court settlement that allowed Yukica to coach the 1986 season, after which he would leave the school.

Although the case was not resolved at trial, Yukica v. Leland has been hailed by the American Football Coaches Association and others as setting an important precedent in sports law. The case also affected how coaching contracts were written, particularly at the college level.

Commission to study the death penalty
In 2009, Murphy was appointed chairman of the Commission to Study the Death Penalty in New Hampshire by Governor John Lynch, which had been dormant from 1937 until the conviction of Michael Addison in 2008. Murphy has been a prominent supporter of the repeal of the death penalty.

References

1937 births
American anti–death penalty activists
Boston College Law School alumni
College of the Holy Cross alumni
High school football coaches in New Hampshire
New Hampshire Democrats
New Hampshire state court judges
People from Plymouth, New Hampshire
Plymouth State Panthers football coaches